The 2018 IIHF U18 World Championship Division I were a pair of international under-18 ice hockey tournaments organised by the International Ice Hockey Federation. The Division I A and Division I B tournaments represented the second and the third tier of the IIHF World U18 Championship.

Division I A

The Division I A tournament was played in Riga, Latvia, from 2 to 8 April 2018.

Participants

Match officials
4 referees and 7 linesmen were selected for the tournament.

Referees
 Patric Bjälkander
 Aaro Brännare
 Andrew Bruggeman
 Andrei Shrubok

Linesmen
 Uldis Bušs
 Daniel Duarte
 Māris Locāns
 Henri Neva
 David Nothegger
 Michal Orolin
 Sotaro Yamaguchi

Standings

Results
All times are local (UTC+3).

Statistics

Scoring leaders
List shows the top ten skaters sorted by points, then goals.

 GP = Games played; G = Goals; A = Assists; Pts = Points; +/− = Plus-minus; PIM = Penalties in minutes; POS = PositionSource: IIHF.com

Leading goaltenders
Only the top five goaltenders, based on save percentage, who have played 40% of their team's minutes are included in this list.

 TOI = Time on ice (minutes:seconds); SA = Shots against; GA = Goals against; GAA = Goals against average; Sv% = Save percentage; SO = ShutoutsSource: IIHF.com

Awards
Best Players Selected by the Directorate
 Goaltender:  Jānis Voris
 Defenceman:  Moritz Seider
 Forward:  Yannik Valenti
Source: IIHF.com

Division I B

The Division I B tournament was played in Kyiv, Ukraine, from 14 to 20 April 2018.

Participants

Match officials
4 referees and 7 linesmen were selected for the tournament.

Referees
 Roman Mrkva
 Joris Müller
 Christian Persson
 Gints Zviedrītis

Linesmen
 Lodewyk Beelen
 Riley Bowles
 Håvar Dahl
 James Kavanagh
 Artem Korepanov
 Anton Peretyatko
 Wiktor Zień

Standings

Results
All times are local (UTC+3).

Statistics

Scoring leaders
List shows the top ten skaters sorted by points, then goals.

 GP = Games played; G = Goals; A = Assists; Pts = Points; +/− = Plus-minus; PIM = Penalties in minutes; POS = PositionSource: IIHF.com

Leading goaltenders
Only the top five goaltenders, based on save percentage, who have played 40% of their team's minutes are included in this list.

 TOI = Time on ice (minutes:seconds); SA = Shots against; GA = Goals against; GAA = Goals against average; Sv% = Save percentage; SO = ShutoutsSource: IIHF.com

Awards
Best Players Selected by the Directorate
 Goaltender:  Eiki Sato
 Defenceman:  David Maier
 Forward:  Oleksandr Peresunko
Source: IIHF.com

References

2018 IIHF World U18 Championships
IIHF World U18 Championship Division I
International ice hockey competitions hosted by Latvia
International ice hockey competitions hosted by Ukraine
Sports competitions in Riga
Sports competitions in Kyiv
2017–18 in Latvian ice hockey
2017–18 in Ukrainian ice hockey
IIHF
Ice hockey in Riga